{{Taxobox
| name = Eomola
| fossil_range = Middle Eocene
| image = Eomola bimaxillaria.jpg
| image_caption = E. bimaxillaria
| regnum = Animalia
| phylum = Chordata
| classis = Actinopterygii
| ordo = Tetraodontiformes
| familia = Molidae
| genus = Eomola| genus_authority = Tyler and Bannikov, 1992
| binomial = Eomola bimaxillaria| binomial_authority = Tyler and Bannikov, 1992
}}Eomola is an extinct genus of sunfish from the middle Eocene.  Its fossils have been found in Russia. Eomola was described in 1992 by James Tyler and Alexandre Bannikov, and the type species is E. bimaxillaria''.

References

External links
 Evolution of the Ocean Sunfish

Molidae
Eocene fish
Eocene fish of Europe
Fossil taxa described in 1992